Munnings is a surname which may refer to: 

Sir Alfred Munnings (1878–1959), English painter
Catie Munnings (born 1997), British rally driver
Clare Munnings, pen-name of two American mystery authors
Frederick Tansley Munnings (born 1875), British spiritualist medium and former burglar, exposed as a fraud
Tim Munnings (born 1966), Bahamian athlete